Patrick Timothy McHenry (born October 22, 1975) is the U.S. representative for , serving since 2005. He is a member of the Republican Party. The district includes the cities of Hickory and Mooresville. McHenry was a member of the North Carolina House of Representatives for a single term.

McHenry served as a House Republican chief deputy whip from 2014 to 2019, ranking member of the House Financial Services Committee from 2019 to 2023, and chair of the House Financial Services Committee since 2023.

Early life, education, and career
McHenry was born in Gastonia, North Carolina. He grew up in suburban Gastonia, the son of the owner of the Dixie Lawn Care Company, and attended Ashbrook High School. A Roman Catholic, he was the youngest of five children.

McHenry attended North Carolina State University before transferring to Belmont Abbey College. At Belmont, he founded the school's College Republican chapter, then became chair of the North Carolina Federation of College Republicans and treasurer of the College Republican National Committee.

In 1998, while a junior in college, McHenry ran for the North Carolina House of Representatives. He won the Republican primary but lost the general election.

After earning a B.A. in history in 1999, McHenry worked for the media consulting firm DCI/New Media, in Washington, D.C. He was involved in Rick Lazio's campaign in the 2000 United States Senate election in New York; his main project was running a Web site, NotHillary.com. In 2012, he received an honorary M.B.A. in entrepreneurship from Yorktown University.

Early political career
In mid-2000, Karl Rove hired McHenry to be the National Coalition Director for George W. Bush's 2000 presidential campaign. In late 2000 and early 2001, he was a volunteer coordinator for Bush's inaugural committee. After working for six months in 2001 as a special assistant to Elaine Chao, the United States Secretary of Labor, McHenry returned to North Carolina and ran again for the North Carolina General Assembly, winning in the 2002 election.

A resident of Denver, North Carolina, McHenry represented the state's 109th House district, including constituents in Gaston County, for the 2003–04 session. He sat on the House Appropriations Committee.

U.S. House of Representatives

Committee assignments
 Committee on Financial Services (Chair)
 As Chair of the whole committee, McHenry serves as an ex officio member of all subcommittees.
 Committee on Oversight and Government Reform
 Subcommittee on Health Care, District of Columbia, Census and the National Archives
 Subcommittee on TARP, Financial Services and Bailouts of Public and Private Programs (Chair)

Caucus memberships
 Republican Study Committee
 Congressional NextGen 9-1-1 Caucus

At age 33, McHenry was the youngest member of the 110th United States Congress; 27-year-old Aaron Schock of Illinois took office in the 111th United States Congress in January 2009. He is a deputy whip and vice chair of finance for the National Republican Congressional Committee's executive committee.

Tenure

"Two-bit" security guard comment
McHenry stirred controversy with remarks on April 1, 2008, regarding a trip to Iraq. Speaking to 150 Republicans attending the Lincoln County GOP Dinner, he called a contractor, reported first by blogs as a "U.S. soldier" – performing security duties in Iraq "a two-bit security guard" because the contractor denied McHenry access to a gym.

We spent the night in the Green Zone, in the poolhouse of one of Saddam's palaces. A little weird, I got to be honest with you. But I felt safe. And so in the morning, I got up early – not that I make this a great habit – but I went to the gym because I just couldn't sleep and everything else. Well, sure enough, the guard wouldn't let me in. Said I didn't have the correct credentials. It's 5:00 in the morning. I haven't had sleep. I was not very happy with this two-bit security guard. So you know, I said, "I want to see your supervisor." Thirty minutes later, the supervisor wasn't happy with me, they escort me back to my room. It happens. I guess I didn't need to work out anyway.Video of Patrick McHenry's "two-bit soldier" remark on YouTube

He later apologized, saying, "it was a poor choice of words."

Baghdad video
McHenry was the subject of discussion regarding a video posted on his congressional campaign website that featured him in the Green Zone in Baghdad, pointing out landmarks and destruction after missile attacks. Veteran's affairs blog VetVoice posted a scathing attack, claiming that McHenry's video violated Operational Security. McHenry later removed the video after discussing the information with the Pentagon, which requested he not place the video back online. Lance Sigmon, McHenry's opponent, later called a press conference to demand an investigation of the video's effect on Green Zone Troops. Sigmon attacked McHenry in a campaign ad about this controversy, prompting McHenry to threaten legal action, claiming the ad was false.

Use of PAC funds
On April 16, 2008, Roll Call reported that McHenry used funds from his political action committee (PAC), "More Conservatives", to fund the defense of former aide Michael Aaron Lay's voter fraud charges incurred during McHenry's 2004 race. McHenry gave Lay $20,000 to pay legal bills on voter fraud charges brought while Lay worked for him.  These expenses were labeled a "Legal Expense Donation", according to Federal Election Commission reports. Lay agreed to a deferred prosecution agreement, which stipulated he complete 100 hours of community service and pay $240.50 in court fees and $250 in community service fees to have the charges dismissed. An employee of the 2004 campaign, Lay lived in McHenry's home in Cherryville, which also served as the campaign headquarters during the 2004 election, and was indicted for voter fraud in McHenry's election, allegedly voting illegally in two separate instances. In response, McHenry claimed the case was part of a "three-year smear campaign" by District Attorney Locke Bell, despite Bell fund-raising for McHenry in previous elections.

Countrywide donations
OpenSecrets' Capital Eye found evidence that McHenry had been taking money from Countrywide Financial, a company involved in the subprime mortgage crisis. McHenry took $5,500 from Countrywide's PAC, and served in an investigation into CEO payout fraud, of which one of the target companies was Countrywide Financial itself.

Elizabeth Warren
On May 24, 2011, Elizabeth Warren, appointed by President Obama to oversee the development of the new U.S. Consumer Financial Protection Bureau (CFPB), attended a House subcommittee meeting chaired by McHenry, who invited her because he felt she had given misleading testimony during another hearing. Earlier that day, McHenry had appeared on CNBC and accused Warren of lying to Congress about her involvement in government inquiries into mortgage servicing.

The meeting had several late and last-minute changes, so Warren altered her schedule to accommodate the chair's request. Around 2:15 pm, McHenry called for a temporary recess to partake in a floor vote. In response, Warren indicated that McHenry's staff had agreed to the 2:15 pm closing time to allow her ample time to attend another meeting. McHenry replied, "You had no agreement. … You're making this up, Ms. Warren. This is not the case." As Warren and some in the audience reacted with surprise, Representative Elijah Cummings interjected, "Mr. Chairman … I'm trying to be cordial here, but you just accused the lady of lying. I think you need to clear this up with your staff."

The CFPB confirmed the agreement, but McHenry refused to apologize for his remarks to Warren.

The Hickory Daily Record, the largest paper in McHenry's district, called for McHenry to apologize, saying that it was "unacceptable for any member of Congress, especially a subcommittee chairman" to treat a witness in the manner in which he treated Warren.

Payday lenders 
McHenry supported a 2020 rule change by the Trump administration whereby payday lenders would no longer have to check whether prospective borrowers can afford to repay high-interest loans.

2020 presidential election 
McHenry did not join the majority of Republican members of Congress who sided with the Trump campaign's attempts to overturn the 2020 United States presidential election. He voted in favor of certifying both Arizona's and Pennsylvania's votes in the 2021 United States Electoral College vote count.

Political campaigns

2004
In 2004, after one term in the North Carolina General Assembly, McHenry ran for Congress in the 10th Congressional district when nine-term incumbent Cass Ballenger retired. McHenry faced a heavily contested primary and bested his closest opponent, Catawba County Sheriff David Huffman, in a runoff by only 85 votes.

In the general election, McHenry won 64% of the popular vote, defeating Democrat Anne Fischer. It was generally thought McHenry's victory in the primary runoff was tantamount to election in November: his district is considered North Carolina's most Republican district, having sent Republicans to represent it since 1963.

2006

In the 2006 election, McHenry defeated Democrat Richard Carsner with almost 62% of the vote.

2008

In 2008, McHenry defeated Lance Sigmon in the Republican primary with 67% of the vote, and faced Democrat Daniel Johnson in the general election. Johnson was considered the strongest and best-funded Democrat to run in the district in over 20 years. In part because of this, the Cook Political Report moved the race from "Safe Republican" to "Likely Republican." This meant that in Charlie Cook's opinion, while McHenry still had a considerable advantage, a victory by Johnson could not be ruled out. Shortly after the Cook Political Report's update, Stuart Rothenberg of the Rothenberg Political Report, also a nonpartisan analysis of American politics and elections, addressed the race and indicated his opinion that an upset was unlikely. McHenry defeated Johnson, 58% to 42%.

2010

McHenry defeated Republicans Vance Patterson, Scott Keadle, and David Michael Boldon with 63.09% of the vote to win the primary. He defeated Democrat Jeff Gregory with 71.18% of the vote in the general election.

2012

McHenry defeated Ken Fortenberry and Don Peterson with 72.54% of the vote in the primary. He defeated Democrat Patsy Keever in the general election with 56.99% of the vote.

2014

McHenry defeated Richard Lynch in the primary with 78.04% of the vote. He defeated Democrat Tate MacQueen with 61.02% of the vote in the general election.

2016

McHenry defeated Jeff Gregory, Jeffrey Baker, and Albert Lee Wiley Jr. with 78.42% of the vote in the primary. He defeated Democrat Andy Millard with 63.14% of the vote in the general election.

2018

McHenry defeated a host of fellow Republicans in the primary with 70.72% of the vote. He defeated Democrat David Wilson Brown with 59.29% percent of the vote in the general election.

2020

McHenry defeated David Johnson and Ralf Walters in the primary with 71.67% of the vote. He defeated Democrat David Parker with 68.91% of the vote in the general election.

References

External links
 Congressman Patrick McHenry official U.S. House website
 Patrick McHenry for Congress
 
 
 
 Profile at OurCampaigns.com

|- 

|-

|-

|-

|-

|-

1975 births
21st-century American politicians
Belmont Abbey College alumni
College Republicans
Living people
Members of the North Carolina House of Representatives
North Carolina State University alumni
People from Cherryville, North Carolina
People from Gastonia, North Carolina
Republican Party members of the United States House of Representatives from North Carolina